Forest Coach Lines is an Australian bus and coach operator. Founded in 1930 in the Northern Suburbs of Sydney, since 2016 it has expanded with purchases in the Mid North Coast and North West Slopes regions in New South Wales. It is a subsidiary of ComfortDelGro Australia.

History

In March 1930, Eric and Trevor Royle trading as Royle Brothers, purchased routes 56 Chatswood station to Roseville Chase and 201 Roseville station to Roseville Chase from E Jones with three buses. In October 1941 the first service operated across the Roseville Bridge to Terrey Hills.

In March 1947, route 52 Chatswood to Artarmon was purchased but quickly sold in November of that year to Brooks Bros.  From the late 1940s, the Frenchs Forest area expanded rapidly and by 1960 the Royle Brothers fleet had expanded to 12 buses.

The operation was renamed Forest Coach Lines in February 1964 and relocated to a new depot in Belrose. In May 1965, route 201 ceased. An expansion into coach charter saw Forest Trailways established with a separate depot in Manly Vale. Eric and Trevor Royle retired in the mid-1960s with the Trevor's sons Bernard and Tony taking over.

In 1973, services were extended to Warringah Mall and in February 1982 to Duffys Forest. In August 1979, a new depot was opened in Terrey Hills to replace those at Belrose and Manly Vale.

The Passenger Transport Act 1990 allowed Forest Coach Lines to commence operating services into the Sydney central business district in July 1992. In August 1991, the Warringah Bus Lines operation was purchased from Shorelink and in July 1998 part of St Ives Bus Service was purchased.

In November 2012, it was announced that Forest had been successful in retaining the contract to operate Sydney Bus Region 14.

In December 2014, a majority shareholding in the business was purchased by mid-market private equity firm Next Capital.

In September 2016, the business of Manly Coaches was acquired with no vehicles. In November 2016, the Mid North Coast business of Ryan's Bus Service was purchased with depots in Coffs Harbour and Woolgoolga. In April 2017, Sawtell Coaches was purchased with a depot in Toormina. In September 2017, Wolters Bus & Coach Service was acquired on the North West Slopes with depots in Narrabri and Wee Waa.

In September 2018, ComfortDelGro Australia (CDC) purchased the business. In November 2022, CDC was awarded the contract to retain Region 14. The Forest Coach Lines brand in Sydney will be replaced by the CDC NSW brand when the contract commences in May 2023. The Forest Coach Lines brand in regional New South Wales is not expected to change.

Fleet

As of July 2022, the combined fleet consists of 250 buses and coaches.

Forest Coach Lines built up its fleet with Leyland buses. In 1972 it placed the first Volvo in Sydney in service. Since then most purchases have been on Volvo or Mercedes-Benz chassis. In March 2013 two Bustech CDi double deckers were introduced.

When the business was renamed Forest Coach Lines in February 1964, a new white and green livery was introduced. These remained the fleet colours until 2013 when as part of its new regional bus contract Forest was required to adopt the Transport for NSW white and blue livery.

Routes operated in Sydney
141: Austlink to Manly via Belrose, Northern Beaches Hospital, Seaforth, Balgowlah & Fairlight
193: Austlink to Warringah Mall via Northern Beaches Hospital, Beacon Hill & Narraweena
194: St Ives Village Shops/St Ives Chase to City QVB via East Killara, East Lindfield, East Roseville, Middle Cove, Northbridge and Cammeray
194X: St Ives Village Shops/St Ives Chase to City QVB via East Killara, East Lindfield, East Roseville & Alpha Road (Express Service)
195: Gordon to St. Ives Chase Loop
196: Gordon to Mona Vale via St Ives Village Shops and Austlink
197: Macquarie University to Mona Vale via Macquarie Centre, Macquarie Park, West Pymble, Gordon Station, St Ives Village Shops and Austlink
260: Terrey Hills to North Sydney via Frenchs Forest, Forestville, Northbridge and Cammeray	
270: Terrey Hills to City QVB via Frenchs Forest, Forestville & Alpha Road
270X: Terrey Hills to City QVB via Frenchs Forest, Forestville & Alpha Road (Limited Stops)
271: Terrey Hills/Austlink/Belrose to City QVB via Frenchs Forest, Forestville & Alpha Road
273: Killarney Heights to City QVB via Frenchs Forest, Forestville & Alpha Road
274: Davidson to City QVB via Frenchs Forest, Forestville & Alpha Road
277: Chatswood to Castle Cove
278: Chatswood/Forestville to Killarney Heights
280: Chatswood to Warringah Mall via East Roseville, Forestville, Frenchs Forest, Skyline & Allambie
281: Chatswood to Davidson via Forestville & Frenchs Forest
282: Chatswood to Belrose via Forestville, Frenchs Forest & Davidson
283: Chatswood to Belrose via Forestville & Frenchs Forest
284: Chatswood to Duffys Forest via Forestville, Frenchs Forest & Belrose, Austlink & Terrey Hills

Routes operated in Coffs Harbour
 362: Boambee to Coffs Harbour via SCU Coffs Harbour Campus & CH Base Hospital
 363: Boambee to Coffs Harbour via Pacific Hwy 
 364: Sawtell to Coffs Harbour via Hogbin Dr (Loop Service)  
 370: Sawtell to Coffs Harbour via Toormina & SCU, Coffs Harbour Campus 
 371: Toormina to Boambee (Loop Service) 
 372: Coffs Harbour to Grafton via Woolgoolga

References

External links

Bus Australia gallery

Bus companies of New South Wales
Bus transport in Sydney
ComfortDelGro companies
Transport companies established in 1930
Australian companies established in 1930